Pentalonia nigronervosa (banana aphid) is an aphid in the superfamily Aphidoidea in the order Hemiptera. It is a true bug and sucks sap mainly from Musa species.

Host plants
Also known to infest Alpinia purpurata, Xanthosoma sp., cardamom, Heliconia sp., tomatoes, taro, Calla, Costus, and Zingiber sp.

References

External links 
 http://aphid.aphidnet.org/Pentalonia_nigronervosa.php
 http://nature.berkeley.edu/~rodrigoalmeida/Lab%20page/papers/Robson07.pdf
 http://canacoll.org/Hemip/Staff/Foottit/PDFs/Pentalonia2010.pdf
 https://web.archive.org/web/20150225172433/http://www.agri.huji.ac.il/mepests/PentaloniaNigronervosa.html
 https://web.archive.org/web/20150225172433/http://www.ppo.ir/Uploads/English/Articles/insect/Banana-aphid-Pentalonia-nigronervosa.pdf

Macrosiphini
Agricultural pest insects
Insects described in 1859
Hemiptera of Asia